Emmanuel Fratianni is a conductor, composer and jazz pianist active in the international concert world as well as the music of film, television, video games. Born in the city of Montreux, Switzerland of Italian origin, Emmanuel retains right to work status in both the United States and European Union. Beginning in 2010 he was awarded the position of principal conductor of the internationally acclaimed concert series Video Games Live, and is also known for his compositions on the multi-award-winning score of the video game Advent Rising.

Early life
Playing piano at the age of six, Emmanuel began his classical music studies upon acceptance to the Montreux Conservatory, in his hometown. As a teen, he discovered the jazz of Oscar Peterson, Bill Evans, Herbie Hancock and began performing publicly at age 14.  By his late teens, Emmanuel’s jazz quartet was to debut on the outer stages of the famed Montreux Jazz Festival. Emmanuel studied with eminent jazz educators Dick Grove, Lou Levy, Thierry Lang and pursued conducting studies in Los Angeles with Jack Feierman.

Emmanuel’s prolific jazz composing was recognized when he was awarded Montreux’s most prestigious commission, at the age of 28. His concerto grosso September Suite, premiered at the Stravinsky Auditorium. The live recording marked the beginning of Emmanuel¹s recording career.

Film music
Emmanuel began pursuing collaborative work with visual and movement artists in Europe, when he was awarded a visiting artist visa by the United States in 2000. He continued his training at UCLA in post graduate studies and privately with critically acclaimed, multi-Emmy winning television composers Alf Clausen (The Simpsons), and Jay Chattaway (Star Trek).

He began working at the Paramount Music Library in 2003 as part of the score preparation team. He prepared the music and performed orchestration and score supervision for films and TV franchises over a span of 10 years, such as JAG, Stepford Wives, The Amazing Spider-Man and Avatar. He composed incidental music and underscoring licensed for a number of TV shows and programs including JAG, Breaking Bad and Dateline NBC.

Video games
In 2005, Emmanuel joined forces with Tommy Tallarico and Laurie Robinson to compose the music for the video game Advent Rising. In that same year, the music from the game was performed during the launch of the Video Games Live concert series at the Hollywood Bowl, featuring the Los Angeles Philharmonic before an audience of 11,000 people.

Guest conductor
In 2010, Emmanuel became the Principal Conductor of Video Games Live. Since then, Emmanuel has guest conducted extensively around the world for many renowned orchestras including the San Francisco Symphony Orchestra, Baltimore Symphony Orchestra, National Symphony Orchestra, Houston Symphony Orchestra, Dallas Symphony Orchestra, Royal Scottish National Orchestra, Utah Symphony Orchestra, Indianapolis Symphony Orchestra, Nashville Symphony Orchestra, North Carolina Symphony Orchestra, Spanish National Symphony Orchestra, Beijing Opera and Performing Arts Orchestra and Chile National Symphony Orchestra as well as multi platinum artist David Foster and Friends. In summer 2015 Emmanuel Fratianni will make his debut guest conducting the Czech National Symphony Orchestra.

Other work
In 2013, Emmanuel and his partner, composer Laurie Robinson, were commissioned to create Portale, Symphony in an Airport, a symphonic poem to commemorate the grand opening of the Tom Bradley International Airport at Los Angeles International Airport. A neoclassical concerto grosso in 6 movements, the symphony was sponsored in part by Westfield Corporation, the City of Los Angeles, Ville de Lausanne and Canton de Vaud in Switzerland. Featuring 5 international recording artists, the commission represented a return of public and private philanthropy to the funding of new public works or art.

Emmanuel is also co-founder of the Southern California Piano Academy, a Los Angeles music conservatory and pedagogical workshop dedicated to the development of music education for young people.  Emmanuel's video game concert scores for school symphony, choir, wind ensemble and marching band, are published by Alfred Music Publishing in North America.

References

External links
 Homepage
 Facebook
 
 

Swiss conductors (music)
Male conductors (music)
Swiss television composers
People from Montreux
Video game composers
Place of birth missing (living people)
Year of birth missing (living people)
Living people